Deshawn Carter (Born: c. 1982), who is better known by his stage name of Parlay Starr, is an American rapper from South Los Angeles, California, United States.
Parlay Starr grow up in the Pueblos Housing Projects, and is affiliated with the Pueblos Bishop Bloods.

Parlay Starr is a devout Christian and relocated to the vicinity of Bozeman, Montana in 2011 for family reasons.

Early life
Born Deshawn Carter (c. 1982), he grew up in south-central Los Angeles. At Crenshaw High School, he became a standout basketball player, and since the school had a reputation for producing quality basketball players, he met some of the actors and rap artists who came to watch the school games. While at school he entertained the idea of being a rap artist, though he initially chose basketball as a career. He attended Blaine College in Augusta, Georgia, on a basketball scholarship, but left after two years to care for his grandmother.  After his grandmother's death, he returned to college but, with a change in career, found he was seven degree credits short.

Musical career
In 1999 Parlay Starr met and began to perform with the group 2nd II None and by 2001 was rapping "big-time".  Soon there after he was introduced to DJ Quik, and began to tour nationally. 
In 2005, Parlay Starr Connected with Tha Realest, and continued to perform nationally with him for years.

Since then Parlay Starr has teamed up with Snoop Dogg, which made him one of the first underground rappers to get Snoop Dogg to do a complete song and shouts out his name and city on "All Out of Love". Parlay Starr was able to meet many notable performers, including Too Short, Jim Jones, Terrence Howard, and the Outlawz, who encouraged him to break into his own solo career.

In 2009, Parlay Starr created Most Hated Mob Entertainment, and began to release Mixtapes on his own.  In 2010, he released the album "Welcome to my world",  containing guest spots by Tha Realest, Yukmouth, Outlawz and featuring the track "Like You" with Chris Brown, and Tyga, Also featured on Chris Brown's "Takers" Mixtape.

In 2010, Parlay Starr released his 1st solo studio iTunes album called Welcome II My World https://itunes.apple.com/us/album/welkome-to-my-world/id411771210 

Parlay Starr has made a name for himself by grinding the STREETS of South Central Los Angeles. http://www.xxlmag.com/the-break/2012/08/the-break-presents-parlay-starr/   http://jackthriller.com/2012/07/05/featured-artist-parlaystarr-ah-real-one-beef-is-in-da-air-nice-wit-it-videos/ 

Parlay Starr teamed up with DJ Paul http://www.thisis50.com/profiles/blogs/parlay-starr-feat-dj-paul-and-dj-whoo-kid-dat-work-official-music 

2012 Parlay Starr dropped his last MixTape titled  "STARRFACE" (The west is mine and everythang in it) Hosted By Dj Whoo Kid from Gunit records.

2013 Parlay Starr is currently working on new Mixtape titled "LOST CLOTH"... Parlay Starr has dropped two singles off Lost Cloth Mixtape 1. U love 2Pac https://www.youtube.com/watch?v=VNFyZ4SiQD0  and 2. "As the world turns" feat Crooked I https://www.youtube.com/watch?v=BIfhurYPASw 

2014 Parlay Starr Drops his 2nd Studio iTunes Album Called Lost Cloth https://itunes.apple.com/us/album/lost-cloth/id908403188 

2016 New MixTape by Parlay Starr DNA feat Kokan, Bad Lucc, Sean Nuttso Cole, and Boe Almighty…. Hosted by Dj Whoo Kid http://www.audiomack.com/album/parlay-starr/dna

Controversy
During December 2010, Parlay Starr became involved in a "beef" between Chris Brown and Ricky Romance (Brother of Raz B) which originally arose between Chris Brown and Raz B over Twitter. Parlay Starr involving himself when Ricky Romance said that he would put a pistol in Chris Brown's mouth in a video on WorldStarHipHop, Parlay put in word to his connections, who in turn gave word to both Ricky Romance and Raz B to leave Chris Brown alone, effectively ending any conflict.

Parlay Starr is now currently engaged in "beef" with rappers Yukmouth and Tyga.  https://www.youtube.com/watch?v=A3QoHquswvo  which "beef" is no more. . . 2013

Parlay Starr has been accused of "preying on the young women" of Bozeman, MT. It has been reported that his tinder profile states his age is 27. According to sources (this wiki page), He is in his 40's. This is in fact more than a decade of difference (https://tinder.com/ParlayStarr27).

Personal life
As his partner originates from the Gallatin Valley in southwest Montana, they decided to relocate back there after their son was born, as they wanted to “go somewhere and raise him right.” Since they did not want him growing up on the city streets of South Central Los Angeles.

Discography
Albums
 2010: Welcome to my World 
 2011: B4 Da Fame Came vol. 3&4(Mixtape) 
 2012: StarrFace "The World Is Mine And Everythang in it" Hosted by Dj Whoo Kid 
 2014: Lost Cloth 
 2016: DNA MixTape Hosted by Dj Whoo Kid

References

External links
 Official Website 

Living people
African-American male rappers
Rappers from Los Angeles
West Coast hip hop musicians
Bloods
21st-century American rappers
21st-century American male musicians
Year of birth missing (living people)
21st-century African-American musicians
1980s births